José Eliseo Salamanca Bermúdez (born October 24, 1979) is a Salvadoran professional football player.

Club career
Nicknamed Toro (The Bull), Salamanca started his career at Salvadoran second division side Universidad Gerardo Barrios and joined top tier outfit Águila in 2001. In 2006, he joined Chalatenango only to rejoin Águila a year later. He moved to FAS for the 2010 Apertura and played the 2011 Clausura for UES.

International career
Salamanca made his debut for El Salvador in a September 2006 friendly match against Honduras and has earned a total of 3 caps, scoring no goals. He has represented his country at the 2007 UNCAF Nations Cup,.
 
His final international game was a February 2007 UNCAF Nations Cup match against Guatemala.

References

External links

1979 births
Living people
People from San Miguel Department (El Salvador)
Association football midfielders
Salvadoran footballers
El Salvador international footballers
C.D. Águila footballers
C.D. Chalatenango footballers
C.D. FAS footballers
2007 UNCAF Nations Cup players